Okan Çevik (born 8 June 1966 in Edirne, Turkey) is a Turkish professional basketball coach.
Çevik studied at Galatasaray High School and graduated from Istanbul University Faculty of Dentistry.

Coaching career

Early years
Çevik, began his career in Galatasaray Youth Team in 1983.

Galatasaray
In 2009, he signed with Galatasaray Women's Basketball Team. He won EuroCup Women this season. Next season, he signed with Galatasaray Café Crown. But after Jersey scandal, he has been banned for three-years from basketball in Turkey.

Jersey scandal
Çevik is also known for a major scandal in Turkish Professional Basketball. At the beginning of the 2009–2010 season, Cemal Nalga got a five match suspension during 23 September 2009 match against Cibona Zagreb. But, he later played in a friendly match against EnBW Ludwigsburg and Deutsche Bank Skyliners with coaching decision and wore the uniform of his good friend Tufan's number 7. He also been with Tufan Ersöz name in matches list. Nalga later received a two-year suspension in Turkey. Tufan also received a four-month suspension for his actions. And coach Çevik, has been banned for three-years.

References

External links
 Okan Çevik Basketbol Akademisi
 Denizli Basket: Okan Çevik
 FIBA Profile: Okan Çevik

1966 births
Living people
Basketbol Süper Ligi head coaches
Galatasaray High School alumni
Galatasaray S.K. (women's basketball) coaches
Galatasaray S.K. (men's basketball) coaches
Istanbul University alumni
Turkish basketball coaches
Turkish women's basketball coaches